Ivan Jacob (15 July 1925 – 5 February 2009) was an Indian sprinter. He competed in the men's 400 metres at the 1952 Summer Olympics. Jacob won a silver medal in the 4 x 400 metres relay at the 1954 Asian Games.

References

External links
 

1925 births
2009 deaths
Athletes (track and field) at the 1952 Summer Olympics
Indian male sprinters
Olympic athletes of India
Athletes (track and field) at the 1954 Asian Games
Asian Games silver medalists for India
Asian Games medalists in athletics (track and field)
Medalists at the 1954 Asian Games